Renard: histoire burlesque chantée et jouée, or The Fox: burlesque tale sung and played, is a chamber opera-ballet for four male voices and 16 instrumentalists written in 1916 by Igor Stravinsky. Its original Russian text, by the composer, derives from a folk tale as collected by Alexander Afanasyev — but the piece has no name in Russian, being titled generically instead as Байка про лису, петуха, кота, да барана, or Tale of the Fox, the Cock, the Cat and the Ram. (As with the composer's previous stage work, The Nightingale, this burlesque tale is known by its French name despite being wholly Russian.) The premiere took place in a French translation in Paris on 18 May 1922. Duration: 16–17 minutes.

History
In April 1915, Winnaretta Singer, Princesse Edmond de Polignac, commissioned Stravinsky to write a piece that could be played in her salon. She paid the composer 2,500 Swiss francs. The work was completed in Morges, Switzerland in 1916, and Stravinsky himself made a staging plan, trying to avoid any resemblance to conventional operatic staging . He created, rather, a new form of theatre in which the acrobatic dance is connected with singing, and the declamation comments on the musical action. However, the piece was never performed in the salon of the princess. It was not in fact staged until 1922.

The premiere, a double bill with Mavra, was given on 18 May 1922 by the Ballets Russes at the Théâtre de l’Opéra, Paris. Other sources indicate 2 June as the date of the premiere. It was conducted by Ernest Ansermet with choreography by Bronislava Nijinska and decorations and costumes by Mikhail Larionov. Stravinsky remained pleased with Nijinska's "acrobatic Renard, which coincided with my ideas... Renard was also a real Russian satire. The animals saluted very like the Russian Army (Orwell would have liked this), and there was always an underlying significance to their movements."

In 1929, Sergei Diaghilev staged a revival with the Ballets Russes with choreographed by Michel Fokine. Stravinsky was not happy with the revival, saying,  "[it] was ruined chiefly by some jugglers Diaghilev had borrowed from a circus." Stravinsky regretted Chagall's refusal of a commission to do the sets.

Synopsis
This is a moralizing story, a farmyard fairy tale about Reynard the Fox, who deceives the Cock, the Cat and the Goat; but in the end they catch and punish him. The Cock is twice tricked and captured by the Fox, only to be rescued each time by the Cat and the Goat. After the Cock's second rescue, the Cat and the Goat strangle the Fox, and the three friends dance and sing. It also contains a slight irony relating to religion and the church – to be invulnerable the Fox wears the black gown of the nun (nuns used the privilege of inviolability in Russia).

As in his later ballet , Stravinsky employs here the singers as part of the orchestra, and the vocal parts are not identified with specific characters.

Details about the score

Publication
Geneva: A. Henn, 1917; London: J. & W. Chester, 1917; Vienna: . 1917;  (as ) Moscow: Muzyka, 1973.

Duration c. 15–20 minutes.

Dedication: ""

Scoring
Singers: 2 tenors, 2 basses

Ensemble: flute (doubling piccolo), oboe (doubling cor anglais), clarinet (doubling E clarinet), bassoon, 2 horns, trumpet, percussion (timpani, triangle, tambourine with bells, tambourine without bells, cylindrical drum, cymbals, bass drum), cimbalom (or piano), 2 violins, viola, cello and double-bass.

Translations
The French translation by C. F. Ramuz appears in the original vocal score. A German translation by Rupert Koller is in the Chester study score and an English translation by Rollo H. Myers in the current vocal score bears the copyright date 1956. It is somewhat modified on the Stravinsky conducts Stravinsky recording; a more though-going revision heard on Robert Craft's 2005 recording is offered as the composer's own. Later, however, he told Craft: "I prefer to hear [it] in Russian or not at all."

Discrepancies
There are many discrepancies between full and vocal scores, particularly the PV's extra bass drum beat at the beginning, the study score's downbeat at the start of the allegro (not heard on Stravinsky's recording), the rebarring between figures 21 and 22, and the PV's missing third beat of the bassoon before figure 24.

Score and music sample
Stravinsky first developed here an original technique of composition that was almost unknown in the European classical tradition, though quite typical of folk music. The main features of this are the repetition of small, simple melodic phrases (called in Russian ), often in syncopated rhythm, with an irregular meter (changing the time signature almost in every bar); the multi-voiced texture is not a real polyphony, but rather a heterophony, representing monophony or a “ragged unison”, where the melody of one instrument is accompanied and embellished with the fragments of the same melody. For example:

Recordings
key: conductor – petukh (cock; tenor 1)/lisa (fox; tenor 2)/kot (cat; bass 1)/baran (ram; bass 2) – year recorded – first label		
Craft – Harmon/Hess/Galjour/Lishner – 1950 – Dial
Ansermet – Sénéchal/Cuénod/Depraz/Rehfuss – 1956 – Decca
Boulez – Giraudeau/Devos/Rondeleux/Depraz – 1961 – Disques Adès
Stravinsky – Shirley/Driscoll/Murphy/Gramm – 1962 – Columbia 
Ansermet – English/Mitchinson/Glossop/Rouleau – 1964 – Decca
Dutoit – Blazer/Tappy/Huttenlocher/Bastin – 1973 – Erato
Mihály – Keönch/Gulyás/Polgár/Bordás – 1979 – Hungaroton
Dunand – Marchisio/Blazer/Brodard/Loup – 1982 – Rencontre
Chailly – Jenkins-N/Langridge/Hammond-Stroud/Lloyd – 1985 – Decca
Salonen – Aler/Robson/Wilson-Johnson/Tomlinson – 1990 – Sony
Ziegler – Harrhy/Hetherington/Donnelly/Cavallier – 1991 – ASV
Craft – Baker-T/Martin-D/Evitts/Pauley – 1993 – MusicMasters 67110-2
Wolff – Aler/Kelley/Opalach/Cheek – 1994 – Teldec
Conlon – Caley/Grivnov/Naouri/Mikhailov – 1999 – EMI
Craft – Aler/Spears/Evitts/Pauley – 2005 – Naxos
Mantovani – Brutscher/Saelens/Gnatiuk/Nédélec – 2013 – PP distribution
Gergiev – Timchenko/Trofimov/Petryanik/Vlasov – 2021 – Mariinsky label

References
Notes

Sources
Stravinsky, Igor. Renard: Histoire burlesque chantée et jouée / The Fox: A burlesque in song and dance / Reinecke: Gesungene und Gespielte Burleske, miniature score, text in Russian, French, and German. London: J. & W. Chester Ltd., 1917.
 Stravinsky, Igor. Poetics of Music in the Form of Six Lessons. English translation by Arthur Knodell and Ingolf Dahl, preface by George Seferis. The Charles Eliot Norton Lectures, 1939–40. Cambridge, Massachusetts: Harvard University Press, 1947. Reprinted, Cambridge, Massachusetts: Harvard University Press, 1970, . Originally published in French, as Poétique musicale sous forme de six leçons. The Charles Eliot Norton Lectures for 1939–1940. Cambridge, Massachusetts: Harvard University Press, 1942.
 Stravinsky, Igor, and Robert Craft, Conversations with Stravinsky. Berkeley: University of California Press, 1980 (©1959). 
 Stravinsky, Igor, An Autobiography. New York: W. W. Norton, 1998 (©1936).  (Originally published New York: Simon & Schuster). [Ghostwritten by Walter Nouvel]

Russian-language operas
Operas by Igor Stravinsky
Operas
One-act operas
Ballets by Bronislava Nijinska
Ballets Russes productions
1922 operas
1922 ballet premieres